Henry Michael Herlong Jr. (born June 1, 1944) is a senior United States district judge of the United States District Court for the District of South Carolina.

Education and career

Born in Washington, D.C., Herlong received a Bachelor of Arts degree from Clemson University in 1967 and a Juris Doctor from the University of South Carolina School of Law in 1970. He was in the United States Army from 1967 to 1973, achieving the rank of Reserve Captain. He was a legislative assistant to United States Senator Strom Thurmond from 1970 to 1972. He was an Assistant United States Attorney of the Criminal Division in Greenville, South Carolina from 1972 to 1976. He was in private practice in Edgefield, South Carolina from 1976 to 1983. He was an Assistant United States Attorney of the Civil Division in Columbia, South Carolina from 1983 to 1986.

Federal judicial service

Herlong became a United States magistrate judge of the United States District Court for the District of South Carolina in 1986, serving in this capacity until 1991. On April 9, 1991, Herlong was nominated by President George H. W. Bush to a new seat on the United States District Court for the District of South Carolina created by 104 Stat. 5089. Herlong was confirmed by the United States Senate on May 9, 1991, and received his commission on May 14, 1991. He assumed senior status on June 1, 2009.

References

Sources

1944 births
Living people
Assistant United States Attorneys
Clemson University alumni
Judges of the United States District Court for the District of South Carolina
People from Washington, D.C.
United States Army officers
United States district court judges appointed by George H. W. Bush
20th-century American judges
United States magistrate judges
United States Army soldiers
University of South Carolina School of Law alumni
21st-century American judges